Apollonides was a tragic poet of ancient Greece, concerning whom nothing is known. Two verses of one of his dramas are preserved in Clement of Alexandria and Stobaeus. He may have been the same person as Apollonides of Nicaea.

Notes

Ancient Greek poets
Ancient Greek writers known only from secondary sources
Tragic poets